Fukan is a town in northeastern Henan province, China, near the border with Hebei and Shandong provinces. It is under the administration of Nanle County.

References 

Township-level divisions of Henan